The "Civil War" EP (better known as simply Civil War) is the third extended play by Guns N' Roses, released in the UK only on May 24, 1993. It is named after the song of the same name. The EP is a compilation, departing from the band's previous two live-style EPs. Included are songs from both Use Your Illusion I and Use Your Illusion II, and an exclusive interview with Slash.

Artwork

The front cover to the EP is black. Each copy was individually numbered. On the actual case of the CD, the silver words "Guns N' Roses" were stuck on. The EP-style case even features a flap advertisement in the "booklet", with one side advertising the band's gig at Milton Keynes, England, and the other side advertises the band's video single for Garden of Eden which was released on the same day.

On the German Editions' front cover, the subtitle 'Civil War' and the blood-like graphical element is more on the right down corner, and there is no individual numbering.

Track listing

Personnel

Guns N' Roses
W. Axl Rose – lead vocals, whistling on "Civil War", sound effects on "Garden of Eden", acoustic guitar on "Dead Horse".
Slash – lead guitar
Izzy Stradlin – rhythm guitar, backing vocals
Duff McKagan – bass, backing vocals
Matt Sorum – drums, percussion
Dizzy Reed – piano, backing vocals

Additional personnel
Steven Adler – drums on "Civil War"
Johann Langlie – synthesizer programming on "Garden of Eden"
Mike Clink – nutcracker on "Dead Horse", production, engineering
Bill Price – mixing
George Marino – mastering

Charts

References 

1993 EPs
Geffen Records EPs
Guns N' Roses EPs